Miles Davis at Carnegie Hall is a live album by American jazz musician Miles Davis. Subtitled The Legendary Performances of May 19, 1961, it was released by Columbia Records as CL 1812 in monaural and CS 8612 as "electronically re-channeled for stereo."

This live performance features Davis with his regular quintet and also accompanied by Gil Evans and his 21-piece orchestra. The orchestra is heard on several selections drawn from Miles Ahead as well as a complete reading of the adagio movement from Concierto de Aranjuez as recorded on Sketches of Spain.

The concert begins with the orchestra playing the Gil Evans introduction to "So What", which is performed by the quintet, and then segues directly into the only recording of an Evans arrangement of "Spring is Here".

Track listing of the original LP 

"So What" (Miles Davis) – 12:04
"Spring Is Here" (Lorenz Hart, Richard Rodgers) – 3:58
"No Blues" (Davis) – 10:55
"Oleo" (Sonny Rollins) – 7:23
"Someday My Prince Will Come" (Frank Churchill, Larry Morey) – 2:43
"The Meaning of the Blues" / "Lament" / "New Rhumba" (Troup, Worth / J.J. Johnson / Ahmad Jamal) – 8:31

CD version of the complete concert 

A two-disc CD version of the complete concert was released by Sony/Columbia in 1998. This album has the first half of the concert on CD 1 and the second half on CD 2. This is the only CD edition of the album to feature the original mono mix.

Track listing: CD 1

"So What" (Miles Davis) – 12:01
"Spring Is Here" (Lorenz Hart, Richard Rodgers) – 4:03
"Teo" (Davis) – 9:10
"Walkin'" (Richard Carpenter) – 9:32
"The Meaning of the Blues" / "Lament" (Troup, Worth/J.J. Johnson) – 4:34
"New Rhumba" (Ahmad Jamal) – 4:07

Track listing: CD 2

"Someday My Prince Will Come" (Frank Churchill, Larry Morey) – 2:55
"Oleo" (Sonny Rollins) – 7:19
"No Blues" (Davis) – 10:38
"I Thought About You" (J. Van Heusen/J. Mercer) – 5:00
"En Aranjuez Con Tu Amor" (adagio from Concierto de Aranjuez) (J. Rodrigo) – 17:05

Personnel

The Miles Davis Quintet:
Miles Davis - Trumpet
Hank Mobley - Tenor saxophone
Wynton Kelly - Piano
Paul Chambers - Bass
Jimmy Cobb - Drums

The Gil Evans Orchestra:
Gil Evans - Arranger and Conductor
Miles Davis - Trumpet soloist
Ernie Royal, Bernie Glow, Johnny Coles, Louis Mucci - Trumpets
Jimmy Knepper, Dick Hixon, Frank Rehak - Trombones
Julius Watkins, Paul Ingrahan, Bob Swisshelm - French Horns
Bill Barber - Tuba
Romeo Penque, Jerome Richardson, Eddie Caine, Bob Tricarico, Danny Bank - Reeds and Woodwinds
Janet Putnam - Harp
Wynton Kelly - Piano (on "Spring is Here" only)
Paul Chambers - Bass
Jimmy Cobb - Drums
Bobby Rosengarden - Percussion

Production:
Teo Macero - Producer

Charting history

References

External links

1961 live albums
Albums produced by Teo Macero
Miles Davis live albums
Columbia Records live albums
Albums recorded at Carnegie Hall
Legacy Recordings live albums
Live hard bop albums
Albums conducted by Gil Evans
Albums arranged by Gil Evans